Kenneth Price (1935–2012) was an American ceramist and printmaker.

Kenneth, Ken or Kenny Price may also refer to:
 Kenneth Lester Price Jr. (born 1943), American prelate of the Episcopal Church
 Ken Price (footballer, born 1939), English football (soccer) player
 Ken Price (footballer, born 1954), English football (soccer) player
 Ken Price (weightlifter) (born 1941), British Olympic weightlifter
 Kenny Price (1931–1987), singer and actor